Cao Yuanhang (born 20 November 1991) is a Paralympian athlete from China competing mainly in T37 classification sprint and long jump events.

Cao represented her country at the 2012 Summer Paralympics in London, where she won two medals; an individual bronze in the T37 long jump and a silver in the women's 4 × 100 m relay (T35-38). As well as her Paralympic success Cao has won medals at both World Championships and the Asian Para Games, winning three medals over three tournament.

Personal history
Cao was born in Foshan, China in 1991. Due to complications at birth she has cerebral palsy. She lives in Zhanjiang Province and is a professional athlete.

References

Paralympic athletes of China
Athletes (track and field) at the 2012 Summer Paralympics
Paralympic bronze medalists for China
Paralympic silver medalists for China
Living people
1991 births
Medalists at the 2012 Summer Paralympics
Chinese female sprinters
Chinese female long jumpers
People from Foshan
Runners from Guangdong
Paralympic medalists in athletics (track and field)
21st-century Chinese women